Hertha BSC's 2007–08 season began on 4 August 2007, with their DFB-Pokal match against Unterhaching, and ended 17 May 2008, with their Bundesliga match against Bayern Munich. They finished tenth in the Bundesliga and were eliminated in the second round of the DFB-Pokal.

Players

First-team squad
Squad at end of season

Transfers

Summer

In:

Out:

Winter

In:

Out:

Statistics

Goalscorers

Fixtures

DFB-Pokal

First round

Second round

Bundesliga

References

Notes

Hertha BSC seasons
Hertha